Prince Rupert refers to Prince Rupert of the Rhine (Rupert, Count Palatine of the Rhine, Duke of Bavaria) (1619–1682), noted German and British soldier, admiral, scientist, sportsman, colonial governor, and amateur artist.

Prince Rupert may also refer to:

People
 Rupert Cambridge, Viscount Trematon (Prince Rupert of Teck) (1907–1928), a member of the British Royal Family, a great-grandson of Queen Victoria
 Prince Rupert Loewenstein (1933–2014), German aristocrat and band manager

Places
 Prince Rupert, British Columbia, a city in Canada 
 Prince Rupert (electoral district), a provincial electoral district in the Canadian province of British Columbia
 Prince Rupert, Edmonton, a neighbourhood in Edmonton, Alberta, Canada

Airports
 Prince Rupert Airport, an airport outside Prince Rupert, British Columbia, Canada
 Prince Rupert/Digby Island Water Aerodrome, an airport outside Prince Rupert, British Columbia, Canada
 Prince Rupert/Seal Cove Water Aerodrome, an airport adjacent to Prince Rupert, British Columbia, Canada

Organizations
 Prince Rupert Port Authority, a port authority responsible for all waterfront properties on Prince Rupert Harbour, British Columbia, owned by the Canadian federal government
 Prince Rupert Secondary School, a public high school in Prince Rupert, British Columbia, Canada
 School District 52 Prince Rupert, a school district in British Columbia, Canada, serving Prince Rupert and Hartley Bay

Ships
 , a sailing ship chartered by the New Zealand Company ships in 1841
 , a Canadian steamship in service along the coast of British Columbia, Alaska, and Washington from 1910 to 1956
 , a British monitor of the Royal Navy launched in 1915 and scrapped in 1923
 , a Royal Canadian Navy frigate in commission during World War II
 , a Canadian roll-on/roll-off ferry in service on the coast of British Columbia from 1966 to 2009
 , operated by the Hudson's Bay Company (HBC) from 1744–1760, see Hudson's Bay Company vessels
 , operated by the HBC from 1755–1768, see Hudson's Bay Company vessels
 , operated by the HBC from 1769–1786, see Hudson's Bay Company vessels
 , operated by the HBC from 1827–1841, see Hudson's Bay Company vessels
 , operated by the HBC from 1865–1886, see Hudson's Bay Company vessels
 , operated by the HBC from 1887–1891, see Hudson's Bay Company vessels

Objects
 Prince Rupert's drop, glass objects created by dripping molten glass into cold water